Najmiddin Jalolov ( Nadzhmuddin Kamolitdinovich Dzhalolov, a.k.a. Abu Yahya Muhammad Fatih; April 1, 1972 – September 14, 2009) was the leader of the Jama'at al-Jihad al-Islami, a militant organization affiliated with Al Qaeda that operates in the larger Central Asian region. The group was also suspected of planning attacks in Russia and Western Europe.

Early life

Jalolov was born in the town of Xartum, Andijan Region, Uzbek SSR, today Uzbekistan.
He trained in mines and explosives at al Qaida camps and participated in operations in Afghanistan and Pakistan on the Taliban side.

Terror activities
Jalolov was a former member of the Islamic Movement of Uzbekistan (IMU), another organization affiliated with Al Qaeda. Uzbek courts found Jalolov guilty of terrorism in absentia in 2000. He left IMU around 2000 and took part in Islamic Jihad Union.

He was considered a potential ringleader in a September 2007 plot to attack several venues in Germany, according to the United States Treasury Department. In 2006, he directed the casing of terrorist targets, particularly hotels catering to Western visitors, in Central Asia.

Jalolov was tied to Taliban leader Mohammed Omar, Uyghur militant Abu Mohammad, and Al Qaeda leader Osama bin Laden. In 2004, he ordered the attacks on the US Embassy and the Israeli
Embassy in Tashkent.

Death
Jalolov was killed in a U.S. Predator drone strike in Pakistan on 14 September 2009.

References

1972 births
2009 deaths
People from Andijan Region
Terrorism in Central Asia
Islamic terrorism in Russia
Uzbekistani al-Qaeda members
Deaths by United States drone strikes in Pakistan
Uzbekistani expatriates in Pakistan
Soviet military personnel of the Soviet–Afghan War
People of the insurgency in Khyber Pakhtunkhwa
Islamic Jihad Union
Leaders of Islamic terror groups
Uzbekistani Islamists